Paolo Casati (in Latin, Paulus Casatus) (23 November 1617 – 22 December 1707) was an Italian Jesuit mathematician. He belonged to the jesuit scientific school founded in the Provincia Veneta by Giuseppe Biancani, and represented later by Niccolò Cabeo, Niccolò Zucchi, Giovanni Battista Riccioli and Francesco Maria Grimaldi.

Biography 
Born in Piacenza to a Milanese family, he joined the Jesuits in 1634. After completing his mathematical and theological studies, he moved to Rome, where he assumed the position of professor at the Collegio Romano. He was given the chair in mathematics after teaching philosophy and theology.

Casati in Sweden

In 1651, Casati was sent on a mission to Stockholm in order to gauge the sincerity of Christina of Sweden's intention to become Catholic.  He subsequently returned to his post at Rome.  In 1677, he moved to the Jesuit College in Parma, where he remained until his death. Casati was a friend and correspondent of the famous florentine librarian Antonio Magliabechi, and other scientists like Carlo Rinaldini, Giovanni Antonio Rocca and Daniello Bartoli.

Casati's Terra machinis mota

The astronomical work Terra machinis mota (1658) imagines a dialogue between Galileo, Paul Guldin, and Marin Mersenne on various intellectual problems of cosmology, geography, astronomy and geodesy.  For example, they discuss how to determine the Earth's dimensions, floating bodies, the phenomena of capillarity, and also describe the experiment on the vacuum made by Otto von Guericke in 1654.  The work is remarkable for the fact that it represents Galileo in a positive light, in a Jesuit work, only 25 years after Galileo's condemnation by the Church.

Casati and Theories on the Vacuum

Casati discussed the hypothesis of horror vacui, that nature abhors a vacuum, in his thesis Vacuum proscriptum, published in Genoa in 1649.  Casati confuted the existence of both vacuum and atmospheric pressure, but he did not rely entirely on scientific observation, and refers to Catholic thought in order to back his claims.  The absence of anything implied the absence of God, and hearkened back to the void prior to the story of creation in the book of Genesis (see Vacuum: historical interpretation).

Named after Casati

The crater Casatus on the Moon is named after him.

Other works
 Fabrica et uso del compasso di proportione (1664), a work explaining the construction and use of proportional compasses.
 Le ceneri dell'Olimpo ventilate (1673), a dialogue about meteorology.
 De gli horologi solari (unpublished manuscript): about sundial construction.
 
 
 Exercitationes matheseos candidatis exhibitaæ (1698)  (unpublished manuscript): a collection of algebraic and geometrical subjects.

Notes

See also
 List of Jesuit scientists
 List of Roman Catholic scientist-clerics

Sources
 
The scientific works of Paolo Casati (1617-1707)
 

17th-century Italian mathematicians
18th-century Italian mathematicians
17th-century Italian physicists
17th-century Italian Jesuits
1617 births
1707 deaths
People from Piacenza
Jesuit scientists
Catholic clergy scientists
Italian Roman Catholics